Holy Angels was an all-girls high school located in Sydney, Nova Scotia, Canada. It was founded in 1885 by the Sisters of the Congregation of Notre Dame. They bestowed the school with the Latin motto:  meaning "He has entrusted you to the care of his angels".

Holy Angels High School was the only publicly funded all-girls school east of Montreal.  It encompassed Grades 10 to 12 and serviced students from all over Cape Breton Island and beyond.

On Thursday, October 28, 2010, the Cape Breton – Victoria Regional School Board announced that it will close Holy Angels High School in June 2011, prompting 200 students to picket outside the board's offices.  The school board leased the school from the Sisters of the Congregation of Notre Dame, which planned to sell the property in 2011.  The school board said the Nova Scotia Department of Education could not afford to purchase the school from the order. The school closed in June 2011.

References

External links

CBC Radio's Maritime Noon interviews on the school's last day, June 29, 2011. Starts at 43:35.

Girls' schools in Canada
High schools in Nova Scotia
Schools in the Cape Breton Regional Municipality
 Educational institutions established in 1885
 Educational institutions disestablished in 2011
 Catholic secondary schools in Nova Scotia
 Private schools in Nova Scotia
 1885 establishments in Nova Scotia
 2011 disestablishments in Nova Scotia
 Former schools in Nova Scotia
 Defunct schools in Canada